El lobo is a 2004 Spanish drama biographical film directed by Miguel Courtois and starring Eduardo Noriega.

Plot
The film is based on the life of Mikel Lejarza, an agent of the Spanish intelligence service in the early 1970s. During the end of the Francoist State, Lejarza infiltrated ETA, a paramilitary group seeking independence for the Basque Country.

He obstructed plans for a major prison breakout and a campaign of attacks. The secret services tried to demobilise him when he became less useful. However, he pursued his mission nevertheless, which became the most successful government initiative against ETA. Information he provided was responsible for the capture or killing of a quarter of its members, including some of its Special Forces members and leaders. He destabilized the organization when it was a potential justification for conservatives to seize power and stop the democratisation process.

ETA sentenced him to death and posted his pictures throughout the Basque country, in the hope of someone reporting his whereabouts. Mikel changed his name and face and has lived under an assumed identity ever since.

Cast

Awards and nominations

Won
Goya Awards
Best Editing (Guillermo S. Maldonado)
Best Special Effects

Nominated
Goya Awards
Best Actor (Eduardo Noriega)
Best Production Supervision
Best Supporting Actress (Silvia Abascal)

Spanish Actors Union
Performance in a Minor Role, Male (Santiago Ramos)
Supporting Performance, Female (Silvia Abascal)

See also 
 List of Spanish films of 2004

External links
 

2004 films
2000s thriller films
Spanish drama films
2000s Spanish-language films
Thriller films based on actual events
Films set in Spain
Films about ETA (separatist group)
Films directed by Miguel Courtois
2000s Spanish films